Zach Collins (born November 19, 1997) is an American professional basketball player for the San Antonio Spurs of the National Basketball Association (NBA). He played college basketball for the Gonzaga Bulldogs. He was drafted by the Sacramento Kings with the 10th overall pick in the 2017 NBA draft and was traded to the Portland Trail Blazers on draft night. He spent four seasons in Portland before signing with the Spurs as a free agent in August 2021.

High school career
Collins played high school basketball at Bishop Gorman High School in Summerlin, Nevada, where he helped to lead his school to four consecutive state championships. For his first three seasons at Bishop Gorman, Collins came off the bench and played alongside fellow seven-footers and McDonald's All-Americans Stephen Zimmerman and Chase Jeter.

Collins had a productive senior year, averaging 17.3 points, 14 rebounds, 3.1 assists, and 6.4 blocked shots on his way to the most valuable player of Nevada's Southwest League and the Nevada Gatorade Player of the Year award. Collins also broke Nevada's single-season record for most rebounds and blocked shots during his senior season.

In the summer of 2015, Collins competed in the FIBA 3x3 Under-18 World Championships, where he teamed up with Jalek Felton, Payton Pritchard, and P.J. Washington and won the USA tournament. His team moved on to represent the US at the 2015 World Championship in Debrecen, Hungary, where they finished in eighth place. His team advanced to the final 16 where they defeated Poland, but then lost a close game to France, featuring fellow Gonzaga commit Killian Tillie, in the quarter-finals.

Despite being rated as a four-star prospect, Collins was named to the 2016 McDonald's All-American Game. Collins was the first McDonald's All-American to commit to Gonzaga out of high school, but three other McDonald's All-American transferred to Gonzaga after attending other colleges: Micah Downs, Kyle Wiltjer, and Nigel Williams-Goss. Collins helped to lead the West squad to a 114–107 win in the while scoring nine points, along with six rebounds, three assists, and two steals on 3-for-5 field goals and 1-for-2 three-pointers in 12 minutes of play.

Recruiting
In the winter of 2015, during Collins' junior year in high school, he took official visits to California, San Diego State, Utah, New Mexico, and Gonzaga, as well as unofficial visits to UNLV. After his junior year, in March 2015, Collins committed to Gonzaga. He signed with the Zags in the early signing period as a key member of Gonzaga's highest-ranked recruiting class in school history.

College career
As a freshman at Gonzaga, Collins usually played off the bench as a center, working in rotation – and occasionally in tandem – with fifth-year senior center Przemek Karnowski. During the 2016–17 season, he averaged 10 points, 5.9 rebounds, and 1.7 blocks over 17.3 minutes of playing time per game. In the national semifinal game of the 2017 NCAA Division I men's basketball tournament, Collins scored 14 points, collected 13 rebounds, and made six blocks, as the Bulldogs defeated the South Carolina Gamecocks, 77–73, sending them to their first national championship game.

Professional career

Portland Trail Blazers (2017–2021)
At the conclusion of his freshman season, Collins announced his intention to forgo his final three years of college eligibility and enter the 2017 NBA draft. He was drafted 10th overall by the Sacramento Kings and subsequently traded to the Portland Trail Blazers. On July 3, 2017, Collins signed with the Trail Blazers.

On November 5, 2019, the Trail Blazers announced that Collins had undergone successful surgery in repairing his left labrum and was expected to be sidelined for about four months. On December 30, 2020, the Trail Blazers announced that Collins had undergone successful surgery in repairing his left medial malleolus stress fracture, and as result he missed the entire season.

Collins refractured his foot, and on June 29, 2021, the Trail Blazers announced that he underwent a second revision surgery to repair his left medial malleolus stress fracture.

San Antonio Spurs (2021–present)
On August 11, 2021, Collins signed with the San Antonio Spurs. On January 16, 2022, he was assigned to the Austin Spurs of the NBA G League, while recovering from his ankle injury. On January 31, he was recalled. He made his Spurs debut February 4 against the Houston Rockets, scoring 10 points and grabbing seven rebounds.

On February 10, 2023, Collins scored 29 points and grabbed 11 rebounds during a 138–131 double overtime loss against the Detroit Pistons.

Career statistics

NBA

Regular season

|-
| style="text-align:left;"| 
| style="text-align:left;"| Portland
| 66 || 1 || 15.8 || .398 || .310 || .643 || 3.3 || .8 || .3 || .5 || 4.4
|-
| style="text-align:left;"| 
| style="text-align:left;"| Portland
| 77 || 0 || 17.6 || .473 || .331 || .746 || 4.2 || .9 || .3 || .9 || 6.6
|- class="sortbottom"
|-
| style="text-align:left;"| 
| style="text-align:left;"| Portland
| 11 || 11 || 26.4 || .471 || .368 || .750 || 6.3 || 1.5 || .5 || .5 || 7.0
|-
| style="text-align:left;"| 
| style="text-align:left;"| San Antonio
| 28 || 4 || 17.9 || .490 || .341 || .800 || 5.5 || 2.2 || .5 || .8 || 7.8
|- class="sortbottom"
| style="text-align:center;" colspan="2"| Career
| 182 || 16 || 17.5 || .452 || .327 || .743 || 4.2 || 1.1 || .3 || .7 || 6.0

Playoffs

|-
| style="text-align:left;"| 2018
| style="text-align:left;"| Portland
| 4 || 0 || 17.5 || .367 || .214 || .750 || 3.0 || 1.5 || .8 || .5 || 7.0
|-
| style="text-align:left;"| 2019
| style="text-align:left;"| Portland
| 16 || 0 || 17.2 || .506 || .333 || .800 || 3.6 || .9 || .4 || 1.4 || 6.8
|- class="sortbottom"
| style="text-align:center;" colspan="2"| Career
| 20 || 0 || 17.3 || .468 || .286 || .793 || 3.5 || 1.0 || .5 || 1.2 || 6.9

College

|-
| style="text-align:left;"| 2016–17
| style="text-align:left;"| Gonzaga
| 39 || 0 || 17.3 || .652 || .476 || .743 || 5.9 || .4 || .5 || 1.8 || 10.0

Honors and awards
 McDonald's All-American (2016)
 Nevada All-Southwest League MVP (2016)
 Nevada first-team All-Southwest League (2016)
 4× Nevada Division I state championship titles (2013, 2014, 2015, 2016)
 NCAA All-Tournament Team (2017)

References

External links

Gonzaga Bulldogs bio

1997 births
Living people
American men's basketball players
Austin Spurs players
Basketball players from Nevada
Bishop Gorman High School alumni
Centers (basketball)
Gonzaga Bulldogs men's basketball players
McDonald's High School All-Americans
People from North Las Vegas, Nevada
Portland Trail Blazers players
Power forwards (basketball)
Sacramento Kings draft picks
San Antonio Spurs players
Sportspeople from Las Vegas